This is a list of Ned's Declassified School Survival Guide episodes in chronological order. The series originally aired from September 12, 2004 to June 8, 2007 on Nickelodeon.

Series overview

Episodes

Pilots (2003–04)

The original series pilot was called Ned's Classified School Survival Guide and featured "Boogie" (rather than Cookie) played by Stephen Markarian, who was on the later series as Albert Wormenheimer. The pilot aired once on Nickelodeon, as a special, on September 7, 2003. The character was recast after the pilot, and the role of Cookie went to Daniel Curtis Lee to show racial diversity in the school. A second pilot with the revised cast was filmed, but was never aired. After these episodes were filmed, production was stopped until the following year. The pilot special was considered a success, so Ned's Declassified School Survival Guide was ordered to series in early 2004 for a first season of 13 episodes to air in the 2004–05 television season. 
 Pilot (aired on September 7, 2003)
 "Ned's Locker" (unaired)

Season 1 (2004–05)
This season follows Ned and his friends through the first semester of seventh grade.

Season 2 (2005–06)
This season follows Ned and his friends through the second semester of seventh grade.

Season 3 (2006–07)
This season follows Ned and his friends through eighth grade.

References

External links
 

Lists of American sitcom episodes
Lists of Nickelodeon television series episodes